A leadership election of the Liberal Party of Australia was held on 30 May 2022, following the defeat of the Scott Morrison government at the 2022 federal election and the resignation of Morrison as party leader. The newly elected leader would become Leader of the Opposition to the Labor Party government of Anthony Albanese. A separate leadership spill for the Liberal Party's Coalition partner National Party was also held on the same day.

Peter Dutton was elected unopposed as leader, while Sussan Ley was elected unopposed as deputy leader. Dutton, who is from Queensland, is the first leader outside of New South Wales to lead the Liberal Party since Alexander Downer in 1995 from South Australia. Simon Birmingham was re-elected leader of the Liberal Party in the Senate.

Dutton is only the second Liberal leader after Downer outside of New South Wales and Victoria. Notwithstanding the party's inaugural leader and deputy leader Robert Menzies and Eric Harrison who had continued with their leadership positions from the previous United Australia Party, the election of Dutton as leader and Ley as his deputy marks the first time that both a new leader and new deputy leader were elected unopposed simultaneously.

Background
After the governing Liberal–National coalition lost power at the 2022 federal election, Prime Minister Scott Morrison announced his resignation as Liberal leader on election night. He had led the party since 2018 and been Prime Minister since Malcolm Turnbull opted not to contest the second of two leadership spills in 2018.

Meanwhile, deputy leader and outgoing Treasurer Josh Frydenberg lost his seat of Kooyong in the election, leaving the position open for election. He was considered a likely successor to Morrison if he had been re-elected to Parliament.

Candidates
Peter Dutton, Minister for Defence during the Morrison Government, has been seen as the front runner to lead the Liberal Party following Morrison's resignation and Frydenberg's defeat. Outgoing Minister for Industry, Energy and Emissions Reduction Angus Taylor, Minister for Home Affairs Karen Andrews, Minister for Trade, Tourism and Investment Dan Tehan, and Tasmanian MP Bridget Archer have also been posited as potential candidates for the leadership. Speculated candidates for the deputy leadership include Minister for the Environment Sussan Ley and Minister for Families and Social Services Anne Ruston.

Leadership

Declared

Declined
Karen Andrews, Minister for Home Affairs (2021–2022) (endorsed Dutton)
Bridget Archer, member of the Parliament for Bass (2019–present)
Angus Taylor, Minister for Energy (2018–2022) (endorsed Dutton)
Dan Tehan, Minister for Trade (2020–2022)

Deputy leadership

Declared

Declined
Karen Andrews, Minister for Home Affairs (2021–2022)
Bridget Archer, member of the Parliament for Bass (2019–present)
Jane Hume, Minister for Superannuation, Financial Services and The Digital Economy, Minister for Women's Economic Security (2020–2022)
Anne Ruston, Minister for Social Services (2019–2022)
Dan Tehan, Minister for Trade (2020–2022)

References

2022 elections in Australia
Liberal Party of Australia leadership election
Liberal Party of Australia leadership spills
May 2022 events in Australia
Uncontested elections